
Tczew County is a unit of territorial administration and local government (powiat) in Pomeranian Voivodeship, northern Poland. It came into being on January 1, 1999, as a result of the Polish local government reforms passed in 1998. The county is part of the area traditionally inhabited by the Kociewiacy ethnic group.

As of 2019 its total population is 115,738, out of which the population of Tczew is 60,120, that of Pelplin is 7,784, that of Gniew is 6,707, and the rural population is 41,127.

Tczew County on a map of the counties of Pomeranian Voivodeship

Tczew County is bordered by Gdańsk County to the north, Malbork County, Sztum County and Kwidzyn County to the east, Świecie County to the south, and Starogard County to the west.

Administrative division
The county is subdivided into six gminas (one urban, two urban-rural and three rural). These are listed in the following table, in descending order of population.

References

 
Tczew